Time to Love is a 1965 Turkish drama film, produced, co-written and directed by Metin Erksan, featuring Müşfik Kenter as a poor painter who falls in love with a photograph of a woman while at work in one of the massive villas on Istanbul's Princes' Islands.

See also
 1965 in film

External links
 

1965 drama films
1965 films
Films shot in Turkey
Films directed by Metin Erksan
Turkish drama films